Oligeriops is a genus of hoverfly from Australia. They are characterised by the reduced size of the eyes, and the genus includes five described species. It was previously considered a synonym of Microdon.

Species
Oligeriops chalybeus (Ferguson, 1926)
Oligeriops dimorphon (Ferguson, 1926)
Oligeriops iridomyrmex (Shannon, 1927)
Oligeriops moestus (Ferguson, 1926)
Oligeriops occidentalis (Ferguson, 1926)

References

Hoverfly genera
Diptera of Australasia
Microdontinae